News Live may refer to:

News Live (Indian TV channel), an Indian Assamese-language satellite news channel
News Live (Philippine TV program), a Philippine TV program, formerly known as News TV Live